Nooksack (Nooksack: Noxwsʼáʔaq) or Nootsack  may refer to:
Nooksack people, an American Indian tribe in Whatcom County, Washington
Nooksack language, the language of this tribe

Places
Nooksack River, a river in Whatcom County, Washington
Nooksack Valley, a valley formed by this river
Nooksack, Washington, a town in Whatcom County, Washington

Schools
Nooksack Valley School District (commonly referred to as Nooksack), a school district in Whatcom County, Washington
Nooksack Valley High School, the high school of this school district